Magnet.me is an online service that connects students and young professionals with employers. Over 250,000 students and over 4,500 graduate employers currently use the service. The Rotterdam based scaleup was founded in 2012 by Vincent Karremans, Freek Schouten, Hugo de Ruiter and Laurens van Nues.

Concept and features 
Magnet.me is a typical two-sided marketplace with on one side students and young professionals, and on the other side employers. Using the platform is free for both sides.

Students and young professionals create a profile with relevant information like study background, work experience, spoken languages, interest and other elements. Consequently, if they then meet the general criteria of an employer, they receive a connect suggestion, or if they meet the criteria of a job or internship, they instantly get pushed the opportunity. Employers can invite students from their own network to apply to jobs and internships and exchange messages via the platform.

Competitive landscape 
Magnet.me has been referred to by one source as the “LinkedIn for students”. The difference between the two is that Magnet.me only focuses on the graduate recruitment market and is a student-to-employer network, whilst Linkedin is a peer-to-peer network.

Direct competitors of Magnet.me are Graduateland and Wikijob.

Awards and recognition 
 First prize Flex Innovation Fund for most innovative business plan in the HR industry (2013)
 UK Department of International Trade Investment Award for best new entrant to the United Kingdom (2016)

See also 
 Graduate recruitment
 Employment website

References 

Employment websites
Projects established in 2012
Graduate recruitment